Jahangir is a surname. Notable people with the surname are as follows:

Asad Jahangir (born 1945), Pakistani police officer and cricketer 
Asma Jahangir (1952–2018), Pakistani lawyer
Hasan Jahangir (born 1962), Pakistani musical artist
Khandaker Abdullah Jahangir (1961–2016), Bangladeshi Islamic scholar
Majid Jahangir, Pakistani actor
Majeed Jahangir (born 1980), Pakistani cricketer
Mohiuddin Jahangir, Pakistani army officer
Muhammad Ahsan Jahangir, Pakistani politician
Nazish Jahangir (born 1994), Pakistani television actress
Sharfuzzaman Jahangir, Bangladeshi politician
Shayan Jahangir (born 1994), Pakistani cricketer
Sirine Jahangir (born 2005), British musical artist
Syed Jahangir (1935–2018), Bangladeshi painter

Surnames of Pakistani origin